Vintage Crop are an Australian music group from Geelong. They took their name from the English horse Vintage Crop.

History 
Vintage Crop formed as a solo project for Jack Cherry, who would record in his bedroom and upload songs to SoundCloud. He was later joined by guitarist Tyson Harper, and brothers Tyler and Luke O'Brien in 2016. The band made their debut in November 2016 with their EP Coming Up.  The EP was released by Weather Vane Records, a label run by band member Jack Cherry in Geelong. It was mastered by Mikey Young of Total Control, who has continued working with the group on each subsequent release. 

On 14 April 2017, Vintage Crop released their debut album TV Organs. It was reissued in France in 2018 by Polaks Records.

Their second album New Age was released in 2018 by Geelong-based Anti Fade Records, and was followed by a tour of Europe. This was followed by the album Serve To Serve Again, released in August 2020 by Anti Fade in Australia, and Upset! The Rhythm in the UK. 

In March 2022, NME Australia reported Vintage Crop had released a new single "Double Slants", and announced their fourth album Kibitzer would be released on 24 June 2022. The album was recorded in one day, and was mixed and mastered by Mikey Young.

Discography

Studio  albums

Extended plays

References 

Musical groups established in 2016
Musical groups from Geelong
Australian rock music groups
Anti Fade Records artists